Kristián Pospíšil (born 22 April 1996) is a Slovak professional ice hockey right winger for HC Kometa Brno of the Czech Extraliga (ELH).

Playing career
He has previously played for Blainville-Boisbriand Armada in the Quebec Major Junior Hockey League. Next season he played for Sioux City Musketeers in the United States Hockey League. He had 40 points in 48 games during the regular season. In the playoffs, he had 14 points.

In the American Hockey League played only two matches for Toronto Marlies with 2 points for 1 goal and an assist. In 2017–18 season played for Orlando Solar Bears in  East Coast Hockey League. In 2018–19 he didn't play any games, but the next season signing a contract for Finnish team Lukko of the Liiga.

Returning for his fourth season in the Liiga in the 2022–23 campaign, Pospisil made 24 appearances with SaiPa, registering six goals and 11 points, before he left the club and Finland after securing a two-year contract with Czech club, HC Kometa Brno of the ELH, on 2 January 2023.

Career statistics

Regular season and playoffs

International

Awards and honors

References

External links

1996 births
Living people
Blainville-Boisbriand Armada players
HC Kometa Brno players
HC Davos players
Lukko players
Newfoundland Growlers players
Ice hockey players at the 2022 Winter Olympics
Olympic ice hockey players of Slovakia
Medalists at the 2022 Winter Olympics
Olympic bronze medalists for Slovakia
Olympic medalists in ice hockey
Orlando Solar Bears (ECHL) players
SaiPa players
Sioux City Musketeers players
Slovak ice hockey right wingers
Toronto Marlies players
Sportspeople from Zvolen
Slovak expatriate ice hockey players in Canada
Slovak expatriate ice hockey players in Switzerland
Slovak expatriate ice hockey players in Finland
Slovak expatriate ice hockey players in the Czech Republic
Slovak expatriate ice hockey players in the United States
Expatriate ice hockey players in Austria
Slovak expatriate sportspeople in Austria